Ilushi is a community in Esan South East Local Government Area of Edo State, Nigeria.  A major river supports economic activities in the region.

References 

Populated places in Edo State